The Elochoman River is a tributary of the Columbia River, in the U.S. state of Washington.

The river's name comes from the name of a Cathlamet (Chinookan) village.

Course
The Elochoman River's headwater's start from Elochoman Lake, in Cowlitz County, from which it flows west for several miles. Joined by the tributary East Fork and North Fork, the main river turns south. After a few miles, the West Fork tributary joins. From there the main Elochoman River flows south and southwest. Its river valley widens into a broad flat bottomland called the Upper Elochoman Valley. Then the river passes through a short but narrow gorge, after which it meanders through the Lower Elochoman Valley.

In its final reach the Elochoman River flows through the sloughs and wetlands of the Columbia River's estuary. Much of the lower Elochoman River, Elochoman Slough, and Hunting Island are part of the Columbian White-tailed Deer National Wildlife Refuge.

Natural history
The Elochoman River supports populations of Chinook, Coho, and Chum salmon, as well winter-run steelhead trout. The steelhead, which routinely number over 1,000 annually, are a draw for sport fishing. The largest salmon (Chinook) ever caught in freshwater in Washington State was caught here by Mark Salmon on Oct 5th, 1992, his catch weighed 68 lbs. and 4 ounces.

See also
List of rivers of Washington
Tributaries of the Columbia River

References

Rivers of Wahkiakum County, Washington
Rivers of Cowlitz County, Washington
Rivers of Washington (state)
Tributaries of the Columbia River